Eugster may refer to:

5664 Eugster, a Main-belt Asteroid
Eugster/Frismag, a Swiss producer of home appliances

People with the surname 
Al Eugster (1909–1997), American animator, writer, and film director
Arthur Eugster (1863–1922), Swiss politician of Appenzell Ausserrhoden
Arthur Eugster (Scouting)
Basil Eugster (1914–1984), Commander in Chief, UK Land Forces
Hans Eugster (1929–1956), Swiss gymnast and Olympic Champion
Hans P. Eugster (1925–1987), Swiss-American geochemist

German-language surnames